Robert Leicester may refer to:

Robert Dudley, 1st Earl of Leicester, favourite courtier of Elizabeth I 
Robert de Beaumont, 4th Earl of Leicester
Robert Leicester of the Leicester Baronets

See also
 Earl of Leicester